The 78th 24 Hours of Le Mans (French: 78e 24 Heures du Mans) was a non-championship 24-hour automobile endurance race for teams of three drivers each fielding Le Mans Prototype (LMP) and Grand Touring (GT) cars held from 12 to 13 June 2010 at the Circuit de la Sarthe, near Le Mans, France, before 238,150 spectators. It was the 78th 24 Hours of Le Mans as organised by the automotive group, the Automobile Club de l'Ouest (ACO).

A Peugeot 908 HDi FAP shared by Sébastien Bourdais, Pedro Lamy and Simon Pagenaud started from pole position after Bourdais set the fastest overall qualifying lap in the first qualifying session. The team led for the opening two hours before retiring with a suspension mounting fault in the third hour, giving the lead to the sister Peugeot squad of Anthony Davidson, Marc Gené and Alexander Wurz until they had to enter the garage to replace a failed alternator. Peugeot's third trio of Nicolas Minassian, Franck Montagny and Stéphane Sarrazin led the following 144 laps before the engine failed due to connecting rod failure, handing the lead to an Audi R15 TDI plus driven by Audi Sport North America's Timo Bernhard, Romain Dumas and Mike Rockenfeller that they held to the finish. It was Bernhard, Dumas and Rockenfeller's maiden Le Mans victory and Audi's ninth overall since . The Audi Sport Team Joest trio of Marcel Fässler, André Lotterer and Benoît Tréluyer finished one lap behind in second and their teammates Rinaldo Capello, Tom Kristensen and Allan McNish completed an Audi sweep of the overall podium another two laps behind in third.

Strakka Racing's HPD ARX-01C car, driven by Jonny Kane, Nick Leventis and Danny Watts, won the Le Mans Prototype 2 (LMP2) category after leading the final 267 laps. They were six laps ahead of the second-placed OAK Racing trio of Jan Charouz, Matthieu Lahaye and Guillaume Moreau in a Pescarolo 01-Judd. Roland Berville, Julien Canal and Gabriele Gardel won the Le Mans Grand Touring 1 (LMGT1) class in a Saleen S7-R, securing Larbre Compétition its fifth Le Mans category victory. The class order and podium was completed by David Hart, Stéphan Grégoire, Jérôme Policand sharing Luc Alphand Aventures' Chevrolet Corvette C6.R and the Young Driver AMR's Tomáš Enge, Peter Kox and Christoffer Nygaard in an Aston Martin DBR9. A Team Felbermayr-Proton Porsche 997 GT3-RSR won the Le Mans Grand Touring 2 (LMGT2) category with drivers Wolf Henzler, Marc Lieb and Richard Lietz. Team Farnbacher's Ferrari F430 GT2 shared by Dominik Farnbacher, Leh Keen and Allan Simonsen were two laps adrift in second and the class podium was completed by BMS Scuderia Italia's trio of Marco Holzer, Timo Scheider and Richard Westbrook in a Porsche 997 GT3-RSR.

Background and regulation changes
The 2010 24 Hours of Le Mans, the 78th edition of the event, took place on the  Circuit de la Sarthe road circuit, near Le Mans, France from 12 to 13 June. The race began in 1923 when automotive journalist Charles Faroux, the Automobile Club de l'Ouest (ACO) general secretary Georges Durand and the industrialist Emile Coquile agreed to hold a test of vehicle reliability and durability. The 24 Hours of Le Mans is considered the world's most prestigious sports car race and is part of the Triple Crown of Motorsport.

In 2009, the ACO approved a series of rule changes for the race. It accepted cars eligible for the FIA GT1 World Championship if they were entered in any one of the ACO-administered championships in the American Le Mans Series (ALMS), Le Mans Series (LMS) or the Asian Le Mans Series (ASLMS). In the event of an accident, there would now be three safety cars deployed rather than two as observed in LMS rounds and illuminated number panels were mandated for night conditions. Pit stops were lengthened due to new tyre switching regulations designed to prevent open-cockpit vehicles from gaining an advantage.

In August 2009, the ACO issued a revised set of technical regulations aimed at achieving parity between diesel and gasoline-powered vehicles. Diesel restrictors, restrictor advantages, and petrol restrictors were reduced in size, while petrol restrictors and Aston Martin Le Mans Grand Touring 1 (LMGT1) engine restrictors were increased in Le Mans Prototype 1 (LMP1) cars. No other class's minimum weights were changed.

Entries
The ACO Selection Committee received 84 entry requests between the opening on 21 December 2009 and the deadline on 20 January 2010, with priority given to manufacturer and full-time teams in one or more Le Mans-based championships such as the 2009 LMS, the 2009 ALMS and the 2009 ASLMS. It initially planned to grant 55 entries divided between the LMP1, Le Mans Prototype 2 (LMP2), LMGT1 and Le Mans Grand Touring 2 (LMGT2) categories, but the ACO thought of increasing the pit lane capacity to 56 cars with the intention of enabling teams to enter "a specific and innovative project" in future years, and thus took steps to ensure the additional pit was operational on 4 June.

Automatic entries
Teams that won their class in the 2009 24 Hours of Le Mans as well as those that won championships in other Le Mans-based series and events such as the LMS, the ALMS, the ASLMS, the FIA GT Championship and the Petit Le Mans received automatic entries. Some championship runners-up in certain series were also given automatic invitations. An entry was also granted to the LMS Green X Challenge, which was a season-long award based on car fuel economy during each LMS event. Because entries were pre-selected to teams, they were limited to a maximum of two cars and were not permitted to change their vehicles or category from one year to the next or their automatic invitation would be revoked. The ACO required automatic entries to confirm that berths had been taken up prior to January 2010.

On November 19, 2009, the ACO released its final list of automatic entries, which included 29 teams. Automatic entries were rejected by Corvette Racing, Lowe's Fernández Racing, Patrón Highcroft Racing and Speedy Racing Team Sebah and Vitaphone Racing Team.

Entry list and reserves

During its yearly press conference, which was broadcast live on the internet on the afternoon of February 4, 2010, the ACO announced the full 55-car list for Le Mans, plus ten reserves. Except in cases of force majeure, the ACO required each entry to confirm a nominated unreplaceable driver. Any withdrawn team after the 1 February 2010 would be replaced by a reserve entry by category, with a GT car replacing another GT vehicle, and the same procedure would be followed for LMP entries. The other two drivers' names were optional but recommended until May 12, 2010, following the 2010 1000 km of Spa.

Dome withdrew its Dome-Judd S102 LMP1 coupe on April 5, 2010, after its partnership with French partner OAK Racing ended, possibly due to budget constraints. The first withdrawal allowed the LMP2 Pegasus Racing Norma MP200P-Judd car to compete. Yoshimisa Hayashi asked the ACO two days later to remove the Tokai University Courage-YGK vehicle from the reserve list so that the university could focus on the following year and build a hybrid powertrain. Modena Racing Group (MRG) did not confirm to the ACO their race entry with a Ferrari F430 GT2 before the entry deadline in May. Team Felbermayr-Proton thus had a second Porsche 911 GT3 RSR promoted to the race in lieu of MRG.

That same month, PK Carsport withdrew its Chevrolet Corvette C6.R due to the car catching fire at the FIA GT1 World Championship meeting at Silverstone Circuit stopping the team from having adequate preparation and resources for Le Mans. AF Corse had a second Ferrari F430 GT2 added to the event due to PK's withdrawal. The financially struggling Pescarolo Sport and Sora Racing withdrew their Pescarolo-Judd entries and the KSM Lola B07/40-Judd car and Matech Competition's second Ford GT1 following failed negotiations for the investment firm Genii Capital to purchase Pescarolo, marking Pescarolo's first Le Mans non-entry since . In June, the ACO announced that the first reserve Race Performance Radical SR9-Judd car would receive the 56th entry to retain a LMP and GT entry balance.

Practice
All teams had a single four-hour free practice session on June 9. Peugeot led from the start, with Franck Montagny's  2 Peugeot 908 HDi FAP lapping fastest at 3 minutes, 20.034 seconds. His teammate Sébastien Bourdais' No. 3 Peugeot was second-quickest, with Loïc Duval's No. 4 Team Oreca Matmut Peugeot third. Marc Gené was the slowest Peugeot factory driver in fourth in the No. 1 car and the fastest Audi was Allan McNish's No. 7 Audi R15 TDI plus in fifth. Aston Martin Racing's No. 009 Lola-Aston Martin B09/60 of Darren Turner was the fastest petrol-powered LMP1 car in eighth. Despite a fuel system issue, David Brabham's No. 26 Highcroft Racing HPD ARX-01C car lapped fastest in LMP2 at 3 minutes, 38.691 seconds. Jonny Kane's No. 42 Strakka Racing-entered HPD ARX.01 and Thomas Erdos' No. 25 RML Lola B08/80-HPD cars were second and third in class. Young Driver AMR's No. 52 Aston Martin DBR9 of Tomáš Enge led in LMGT1 from Stéphan Grégoire's No. 72 Luc Alphand Aventures (LAA) Corvette. Olivier Beretta's No. 64 Corvette led LMGT2 and was third amongst all LMGT entries, ahead of Marc Lieb's second-placed Team Felbermayr-Proton No. 77 Porsche 997 GT3 RSR. Romain Grosjean damaged the rear of the Matech Competition's No. 60 Ford GT against the Armco and tyre barrier entering the Porsche Curves, stopping the session for half an hour. His teammate Rahel Frey lost control of the sister No. 61 Ford in the same sequence of corners, removing the rear wing against the wall. Both vehicles were repaired in time for the first qualifying session.

Qualifying

The first of three two-hour qualifying sessions to set the race's starting order began late 9 June night, in dry and cool conditions. Nicolas Lapierre set the early pace in the No. 4 Oreca Peugeot with a 3 minutes, 21.192 seconds lap until a fuel pick-up issue forced him to stop at Arnage corner, effectively ending his crew's running. In the final half-hour, Bourdais improved Lapierre's lap time to 3 minutes, 19.711 seconds, giving the No. 3 Peugeot provisional pole position. The sister Nos. 1 and 3 Peugeots of Alexander Wurz and Stéphane Sarrazin were second and third, with Lapierre's No. 4 Oreca car fourth. Mike Rockenfeller and Benoît Tréluyer's No. 9 and 8 Audis were fifth and sixth. Kane's lap of 3 minutes, 36.168 seconds put the Strakka HPD ARX-01 car on provisional pole in LMP2, ahead of Brabham's Highcroft entry and Olivier Pla's Quifel ASM Team Ginetta-Zytek GZ09S/2 car. An early lap by Enge in the Young Driver AMR Aston Martin was enough to lead the LMGT1 category. Enge's lap was two seconds faster than Thomas Mutsch in Matech's second-placed No. 60 Ford followed by LAA's Corvettes of Julien Jousse and Jérôme Policand in third and fourth. Gianmaria Bruni put the No. 82 Risi Competizione Ferrari on provisional pole in LMGT2 despite a broken gearbox output shaft requiring the attention of mechanics in the garage for most of the session. Jan Magnussen and Emmanuel Collard's Nos. 63 and 64 Corvettes were second and third in class. Separate accidents for the No. 88 Team Felbermayr-Proton Porsche's front-right blocking the circuit and Matías Russo with the No. 96 AF Corse Ferrari exiting the Porsche Curves disrupted the session.

Russo was taken to the medical centre after the session and found to be unharmed. Due to heavy damage to the car and a lack of spare parts, AF Corse withdrew the No. 96 Ferrari from the race. Following an earlier downpour, the circuit was damp for the second session on June 10, but it quickly dried as qualifying progressed. Wurz led the session with a 3 minutes, 23.238 seconds lap, but the No. 1 Peugeot remained second overall after Wurz was unable to lap faster amongst slower cars. The sister Peugeots of Sarrazin and Simon Pagenaud were second and third. Brabham gave the debuting Highcroft HPD ARX-01C entry provisional pole position in LMP2 with an improved lap of 3 minutes, 34.537 seconds, overtaking Strakka's car by 1.6 seconds. The Quifel ASM Team Ginetta remained third in category. In LMGT1, Bas Leinders moved the No. 70 Marc VDS Racing Team Ford GT past the No. 60 Matech car to second in class behind Enge's category-leading Young Driver AMR Aston Martin. Similarly, AF Corse SRL's No. 95 Ferrari of Toni Vilander took second in LMGT2 with a lap almost three seconds faster and gained four positions in class. Despite crashes for Manuel Rodrigues' No. 13 Kolles Audi in the Porsche Curves, the No. 13 Rebellion Racing Lola B10/60 of Jean-Christophe Boullion at Karting corner, Mike Newton's No. 25 RML entry at Tertre Rouge turn and a collision between Jacques Nicolet and Stephane Salini on the inside at the Ford chicane, the session was not halted.

The weather remained dry for the final session that night. Only a few cars improved their lap times, and Bourdais' pole position time from the first session was not improved upon. Peugeot achieved their fourth successive pole position at Le Mans. Bourdais' No. 3 Peugeot led the session with the day's quickest lap, a 3 minutes, 20.212 seconds. Audi improved all three of their cars during the session to be 2.2 seconds behind the four Peugeots. Rockenfeller's No. 9 Audi qualified fifth, with McNish's No. 7 car sixth and Marcel Fässler's No. 8 entry seventh. In LMP2, HPD-powered cars took the first three places. Watts set a 3 minutes, 33.079 seconds lap in Strakka's car in the final hour for the category pole. Due to traffic, Brabham was unable to better Highcroft's lap and finished second. Enge's first session lap in the Young Driver AMR Aston Martin was unopposed in LMGT1, giving him his sixth category pole position in eight years. The Marc VDS Ford was second after Leinders' second session lap, and Grosjean improved the No. 60 Matech Ford's best lap to third. Bruni's No. 82 Risi Ferrari retained the LMGT2 lead despite setting no laps during the session due to its race-specific gearbox and engine. The two Corvettes of Oliver Gavin and Antonio García overtook the No. 95 AF Corse SRL Ferrari for second and third in category. There were fewer incidents during the session as teams concentrated on the race.

Post-qualifying
After the third qualifying session, the No. 82 Risi Ferrari was subjected to an ACO scrutineering inspection. Marshals failed the car's inspection because the gurney flap on the rear wing was  too low, demoting the vehicle to the back of the LMGT2 starting order. The No. 64 Corvette was promoted to pole position in LMGT2, with the sister No. 63 car second in class. The No. 13 Rebellion Lola car's tub was sent to a nearby carbon fibre workshop because a small hole needed repairing.

Qualifying results
Pole position winners in each class are indicated in bold. The fastest time set by each entry is denoted in gray.

Warm-up
There was one 45-minute warm-up session held on the morning of June 12. Due to a wet track caused by overnight rain, cars were driven on intermediate rain tyres, and several drivers were caught out by the damp surface. Audi and Peugeot traded fastest laps until McNish's No. 7 Audi lapped quickest overall at 3 minutes, 51.401 seconds. In second place, was Gené's No. 1 Peugeot, and his teammate Montagny's No. 3 entry in third. The quickest LMP2 time was a 4 minutes, 8.262 seconds set by Marco Werner in Highcroft's entry over Erdos' second-placed RML car. Leinders' Marc VDS Ford GT was fastest in LMGT1 while Jean Alesi 's No. 95 AF Corse SRL Ferrari led in LMGT2. Tim Greaves damaged the No. 41 Team Bruichladdich Ginetta-Zytek vehicle's front-left and the No. 73 LAA Corvette had a left-rear puncture.

Race

Start and first hours
At 15:30 local time on June 12, in front of 238,150 spectators, Rolex CEO Bruno Meier and triple Olympic skiing champion Jean-Claude Killy waved the French tricolour to start the race. During a reconnaissance lap, Neel Jani's No. 80 Flying Lizard Motorsports Porsche sustained a left-rear puncture after going over a screw, overshooting the Dunlop Chicane, and mounting the kerbs; the car's bodywork was undamaged. Lamy in the pole-position No. 3 Peugeot kept the lead for the first few laps, with factory teammates Montagny and Gené trading second and third on the third lap. Lapierre's No. 4 Oreca Peugeot kept McNish's No. 7 Audi from passing him for fourth. Mike Lewis retired the No. 19 Autocon Motorsports Lola after Arnage turn on lap one due to gearbox input shaft failure. Julien Jousse's No. 73 LAA Corvette overtook Mutsch's No. 60 Matech Ford for third in LMGT1 as the class became a battle between Leinders' No. 70 Marc VDS Ford and Peter Kox's No. 52 Young Driver AMR Aston Martin as Patrick Long progressed to third in LMGT2.

Nigel Mansell crashed the No. 5 Beechdean Motorsport Ginetta Zytek at high speed into the barriers between Mulsanne and Indianapolis turns due to a slow left-rear puncture that the team failed to detect because that part of the circuit was not covered by telemetry. Safety cars were deployed for 31 minutes to allow track marshals to repair the Armco barriers. A motionless Mansell remained in the car until doctors transported him by ambulance to the track's medical centre for check-ups and then to the local hospital. The accident gave Mansell amnesia, haematoma on his brain and a neck injury. When the safety cars were withdrawn, Mutsch passed Kox for the LMGT1 lead after both drivers made pit stops under safety car conditions. The safety cars had divided the field at the front, leaving three factory Peugeots 57 seconds ahead of the three Audis. Kane's No. 42 Strakka and Brabham's No. 26 Highcroft entries battled for the LMP2 lead. Montagny had made a pit stop earlier than teammate Lamy but Montagny's stop was two seconds quicker than Lamy, moving the No. 2 Peugeot to first. Soheil Ayari attempted to lap Jean-François Yvon's No. 24 OAK Pescarolo at Mulsanne turn, but the two cars collided and Ayari's No. 6 Oreca spun.

Dirk Müller stopped the No. 79 BMW on the first Mulsanne Straight chicane before the second hour concluded to conduct an inspection after feeling a right-rear problem. Müller discovered a right-rear puncture and drove cautiously to the pit lane, where it was discovered that the BMW's underside was damaged by kerbstones when Müller stopped. Not long after Leinders lost control of the second-placed LMGT1 No. 70 Ford due to an underinflated left-rear tyre from running on the same tyre compounds since the start and struck the tyre wall in the downhill Esses with the car's right-rear. Leinders returned to the pit lane to retire the heavily damaged car. The third hour saw Lamy enter the garage to retire the race-leading No. 3 Peugeot because the lower front-right suspension mounting point to the chassis was pulled out of the tub from mounting the kerbs too hard. The retirement promoted Oreca's No. 4 Peugeot to third and Tom Kristensen's No. 7 Audi to fourth. Enge's No. 52 Young Driver AMR car had been lapping faster than Xavier Maassen's No. 73 LAA car and overtook the Corvette for second in LMGT1.

Beretta's No. 64 Corvette and Johnny O'Connell's sister No. 63 car battled for the LMGT2 lead, with Bruni's No. 82 Risi Ferrari closing in on Beretta and O'Connell. Over the next four hours, Bruni and Beretta traded the lead several times because of the Risi Ferrari's superior ability to conserve fuel over the Corvette. At the start of the fourth hour, Peter Dumbreck lost control of the No. 85 Spyker C8 at Indianapolis corner and was collected by Frederic de Rocha's No. 38 Pegasus Racing Norma after going off the track again in the Porsche Curves. De Rocha's car was thrown into the outside barrier and sustained irreparable damage to its rear end and transmission, forcing it to retire to the garage. During a pit stop cycle, Anthony Davidson was faster than his Peugeot teammate Sarrazin in the No. 2 car and moved the No. 1 entry into the overall race lead. During a routine pit stop, Romain Dumas' No. 9 Audi hit a television camera operator working for Speed, removing the car's right-front side-view mirror and knocking the camera operator to the ground. The camera operator was stretchered out of the pit lane with a broken shoulder and a gashed leg.

Evening to dawn
Kristensen, driving the fourth-placed No. 7 Audi, was approaching a slow Andy Priaulx on the racing line because Priaulx's No, 79 had a front-left puncture in the high-speed Porsche Curves. Kristensen spun backwards into the tyre wall after Priaulx steered left in the first right-hand corner to left him through. Kristensen was recovered from the gravel, but the pit stop to replace the damaged rear bodywork cost the No. 7 Audi three laps and fell to seventh. Before the sixth hour ended, Bryce Miller crashed the No. 92 JMW Motorsport Aston Martin at the Porsche Curves hard enough to force the car to retire, bringing out the safety cars for the second time to allow marshals to clean the track and extricate the stricken car. During this slow period, Manuel Rodrigues damaged the No. 14 Kolles Audi's front-left against the wall at the right-hand kink before Indianapolis turn and drove to the garage for repairs to the front bodywork. On cold tyres, Nick Leventis spun the No. 42 Strakka HPD into the inside Dunlop Chicane gravel trap but was recovered by a tractor. losing the LMP2 lead temporarily to Werner's No. 26 Highcroft car when Leventis made a pit stop for checks.

When racing resumed, Rockenfeller's No. 9 Audi ran wide leaving the Porsche Curves and his teammate Tréluyer's sister No. 8 entry overtook him for third into the Ford Chicane. Tréluyer damaged the No. 8 Audi's nose on the kerbing almost immediately, and the resulting pit stop moved the No. 9 car back ahead. The No. 1 Peugeot maintained first until Gené relinquished the lead the car had held for 59 consecutive laps, when the car was pushed into the garage with alternator failure, necessitating a new alternator and electronic control unit. The stop lost the No. 1 Peugeot twelve minutes and it fell four laps down in seventh. Jaime Melo's No. 82 Risi Ferrari retired from the LMGT2 lead when the car was forced to the garage to unsuccessfully fix intermittent gear selection issues. This moved Gavin's No. 64 Corvette to the category lead, with teammate Magnussen in second place in the No. 63 car. Strakka's No. 42 car maintained its lead in LMP2, but Brabham in the Highcroft entry was closing the gap to Watts, while Gene in the No. 1 Peugeot was gaining on McNish's fifth-placed No. 7 Audi.

After colliding with the rear of Mutsch's No. 60 Matech Ford and pushing him wide to the inside under braking in the tenth hour, Yvon removed the No. 24 OAK Pescarolo's front-left corner in a collision with the barriers at the Ford Chicane. Because marshals were needed to remove debris from the circuit, the safety cars were dispatched for the third time for nine minutes. Yvon returned to the garage for repairs to the No. 24 car. Mutsch also entered the pit lane for repairs, ceding the LMGT1 class lead to Gabriele Gardel's No. 50 Larbre Compétition Saleen. When racing resumed, Davidson's No. 1 Peugeot collided with Alesi's slower No. 95 AF Corse Ferrari on the inside at the Dunlop Chicane and went into the gravel trap, but he recovered with marshal assistance after losing 90 seconds to Kristensen's No. 7 Audi and making a pit stop for new front bodywork. Due to a puncture on his No. 42 Highcroft car that sent him into the gravel, Marino Franchitti lost two and a half laps to Watts' No. 26 Strakka car but he remained second in LMP2. Duval drove the second-placed No. 4 Oreca Peugeot into the garage for 15 minutes due to repairable right-hand side driveshaft failure and other technical issues, dropping the car to sixth overall.

Just before half distance, Sarrazin's No. 2 Peugeot led the race, followed by Dumas' No. 9 Audi and André Lotterer's sister No. 8 entry. Strakka's No. 42 car, driven by Leventis, maintained the LMP2 lead because his team outperformed Highcroft. Gardel's No. 50 Larbre Saleen led Jousse's No. 73 LAA Corvette by two laps in LMGT1, while Collard's No. 64 Corvette led his teammate García's No. 63 entry in LMGT2. Nicolas Minassian replaced Sarrazin in the race-leading No. 2 Peugeot, extending the car's lead to a single lap over Lotterer's second-placed No. 8 Audi after it suffered a right-rear puncture on the out-lap and a leaking airjack during a routine pit stop that lost him another 30 seconds. Rockenfeller, and later Timo Bernhard and teammate Lotterer, went faster around this point, while Minassian lapped faster to extend the No. 2 Peugeot's overall lead. The No. 60 Matech Ford GT, which was third in LMGT2, was retired after attempts to restart the engine with oil and water were unsuccessful. Enge's Young Driver car outpaced the No. 73 LAA Corvette for third in LMGT1. Werner's Highcroft LMP2 car lost more ground to Strakka's class-leading entry when it entered the pit lane to replace the rear wing section and another pit stop that was delayed by a faulty left-front wheel nut.

Morning to finish

Erdos moved RML's No. 25 entry to third in LMP2 in the early morning when the No. 35 OAK Pescarolo was driven into the garage and Olivier Pla's No. 40 Quifel-entered car went off the circuit at Arnage corner but recovered with marshal assistance. Some teams, including Beretta's No. 64 Corvette, swapped brake discs and callipers at this point in the race. Due to connecting rod failure, smoke and fire began billowing from the right-hand exhaust of Montagny's race-leading No. 2 Peugeot at Tetre Rouge corner. The Peugeot was abandoned on the Mulsanne Straight because Montagny could not return to the pit lane, and ceded the overall lead the car had held for 144 successive laps to Bernhard's No. 9 Audi. García retired the No. 63 Corvette from second in LMGT2 into Indianapolis corner with a sudden engine crank sensor failure. Lieb's No. 77 Felbermayr-Proton Porsche moved to second and Vilander's No. 95 AF Corse Ferrari was now third in class.

Jousse retired the No. 73 LAA Corvette, which was second in LMGT1, off the track as it approached the Indianapolis corner due to a sudden transmission component failure. This moved Christoffer Nygaard's No. 52 Young Driver AMR car and Policand's No. 72 LAA entry to second and third in class, respectively. Davidson's No. 1 Peugeot caught Collard's LMGT2 class-leading No. 64 Corvette off guard while Davidson was attempting to lap an unsighted Collard on the inside in the Porsche Curves. Collard spun backwards into the barrier, severely damaging the Corvette's rear but he was unhurt. Collard had difficulty returning to the garage for rear-end repairs and component changes, which took 32 minutes. Davidson, however, was immediately able to return to the pit lane and repair the Peugeot. The accident necessitated the race's fourth safety car intervention, which lasted nine minutes and allowed marshals to clear debris from the circuit and repair the damaged Armco barrier in the Porsche Curves.

After the restart, Lieb's No. 77 Felbermayr-Proton Porsche had taken over the LMGT2 lead that the No. 64 Corvette had held for 141 consecutive laps, with Allan Simonsen's No. 89 Farnbacher Ferrari second in class. Franchitti kept the Highcroft LMP2 entry second in class until a water leak problem and a cooling system pressure fault forced him to enter the garage several times and drop down the class order. Roland Berville beached the No. 50 Saleen in the gravel near the pit lane entry, causing concern at Larbre Compétition. Mechanics removed gravel from under the car, but it maintained its LMGT1 lead over the Young Driver team by six laps. Gavin retired the No. 64 Corvette on the Mulsanne corner exit with smoke billowing from the left-hand exhaust, a lasting legacy of Collard's earlier collision with Davidson. Giancarlo Fisichella locked the front tyres on the No. 95 AF Corse Ferrari and entered the escape road at Indianapolis corner. The resulting pit stop to repair front-end damage lost the Ferrari second in LMGT2 to Simonsen's No. 89 Farnbacher Ferrari.

Despite suffering a left-rear puncture that required bodywork repairs, Leventis' No. 42 Strakka retained the LMP2 lead over Guillaume Moreau's No. 35 OAK Pescarolo by five laps. Lotterer locked the No. 8 Audi's tyres at Arnage Corner and collided with the tyre wall, necessitating a pit stop for new front bodywork. After a brief battle, Wurz in the recovering No. 1 Peugeot passed Lotterer for second at the Michelin chicane before falling back behind the No. 8 Audi. Wurz had unlapped the lead Audi before retiring in the pit lane with white smoke billowing from the engine compartment's right-hand side turn due to connecting rod failure. The No. 1 Peugeot's retirement moved Kristensen's No. 7 Audi to third overall and Lapierre's No. 4 Oreca Peugeot to fourth. Rockenfeller made an unscheduled pit stop in the race-leading No. 9 Audi because he felt a vibration, which the team determined was caused by a wheel turned on the rim. Drive shaft failure forced Nygaard to enter the garage to allow mechanics to replace it, but the team dropped to third behind Policand's No. 72 Luc Alphand Aventures Corvette 15 minutes after he started the No. 52 Young Driver AMR car for its final stint. Duval relieved Lapierre in the No. 4 Oreca Peugeot and pulled within ten seconds of Rinaldo Capello's third-placed Audi when Duval retired with flames shooting out of his car's right-hand underside into Indianapolis corner due to a major oil fire.

Bernhard, Dumas and Rockenfeller maintained the lead the No. 9 Audi had held for the final 133 laps, and achieved their first Le Mans victories and Audi's ninth since its first in 2000 in a record-breaking 397 laps, covering . They finished one lap ahead of Fässler, Lotterer, and Tréluyer's sister No. 8 car in second, and Capello, Kristensen, and McNish's No. 7 car followed two laps later in third to complete an Audi podium sweep. The No. 42 Strakka HPD car of Kane, Leventis, and Watts led the final 267 laps of LMP2 to win by six laps over the second-placed No. 35 OAK Pescarolo and nine laps over the third-placed No. 25 RML Lola car. Larbre Compétition held their four-lap lead in LMGT1 and Berville's, Julien Canal's and Gardel's No. 50 Saleen achieved the team's fifth class victory. The No. 72 LAA Corvette in second and the third-placed No. 52 Young Driver AMR Aston Martin completed the class order and podium. Following the No. 64 Corvette's retirement, the No. 77 Felbermayr-Proton Porsche won in LMGT2, earning Lieb and Richard Lietz their second category wins, earning Lieb and Richard Lietz their second category victories and Wolf Henzler's his first. Team Farnbacher finished two laps behind the Porsche in second and BMS Scuderia Italia were another nine laps behind in third.

Post-race

The top three teams in each class collected trophies on the podium and appeared in the press conference. Dumas felt that despite some of the French press's predictions to the contrary, he believed he could win, adding: "We knew we had reliability, and that was very important I think – and we had no problems on the car. It just kept running and running without any mistakes." Bernhard commented: "We talked about it, among the three of us, about how it would feel just to stand on the podium with the whole crowd on the bottom cheering and then a couple of days later we achieved that." Rockenfeller expressed delight at having achieved his objective of winning at Le Mans: "I managed to win, with Timo (Bernhard) and Romain (Dumas). Thank you to everyone. My thanks to Audi, to the Joest team, our crew. Great!" Audi technical director Ralf Jüttner heralded the winning-Audi's distance record as reliability not becoming a factor, saying: "It's all about who is fast and who is slower."

Kristensen did not believe Priaulx had seen his approaching car, saying: "It's Le Mans, so you should always expect the unexpected – and in a way I guess you could say I didn't expect that enough, but when there's a BMW driving with three very good and professional drivers, I would expect them to see me and not change the racing line when I'm coming [behind] with a lot more speed." He later said that he had forgiven Priaulx: "At the time it was very frustrating, but when you look at the whole picture it is not so bad. We have finished on the podium. It's part of the way things work at this race." Priaulx admitted he was disappointed to have been a contributing factor in the accident, commenting: "It wasn't like a last minute thing that I decided to go left, but he had committed. People have told me I am not, but my gut feeling is that I am responsible, but sometimes I am very hard on myself."

Pagenaud affirmed Peugeot would return to win at Le Mans in 2011 and described the team's emotions after all three of their cars retired: "Everyone in the team is in tears. This team is like a family and to win this race would have meant so much to us." Davidson was pleased with his race performance and felt he could demonstrate his ability at Le Mans after being judged on his results in the high-profile Formula One series. He said he and Peugeot were inspired by potential victory before his quadruple stint was over. Strakka team manager Piers Phillips praised the team, saying: "Strakka is here for the long term, and this win, as fantastic as it is, is not the peak of our ambitions. It's the platform from which we can move forward. We've proved a point, set a precedent, and raised expectations." Canal admitted that his team did not expect to win in LMGT1, and team owner Jack Leconte was pleased to win the category as a privateer entry after previously receiving manufacturer support.

Race results
Class winners are marked in bold. Cars failing to complete 70 per cent of winner's distance (277 laps) are marked as Not Classified (NC).

Footnotes

References

External links

 

24 Hours of Le Mans races
Le Mans
24 Hours of Le Mans